Boboiești may refer to several villages in Romania:

 Boboiești, a village in Ciuperceni Commune, Gorj County
 Boboiești, a village in Pipirig Commune, Neamț County